

List of Ambassadors

Lior Keinan (Non-Resident, Pretoria) 2017 - 
Arthur Lenk (Non-Resident, Pretoria) 2013 - 2017
Shlomo Dayan 1985 - 1990
Meir Joffe 1983 - 1985
Emmanuel Galbar 1980 - 1983
Emmanuel Ron 1979 - 1980
Meir Gavish 1976 - 1979
Pinchas Gonen 1972 - 1976
Mordechai Palzur (charge d'affaires, Non-Resident, Pretoria)
Azriel Harel 1966 - 1968

References 

Eswatini
Israel